José Aguilar may refer to:

 José Aguilar (baseball) (born 1990), Mexican baseball player
 José Aguilar (boxer) (1958–2014), Cuban boxer
 José Aguilar (footballer) (born 2001), Spanish footballer
 José Aguilar Álvarez (1902–1959), Mexican physician
 José Alberto Aguilar Iñárritu (born 1954), Mexican politician
 José Alejandro Aguilar López (born 1963), Mexican politician
 José Antonio Aguilar Bodegas (born 1949), Mexican politician
 José Marcos Aguilar Moreno (born 1935), Mexican politician
 José Óscar Aguilar González (born 1957), Mexican politician
 Pepe Aguilar, real name José Antonio Aguilar Jiménez (born 1968), Mexican-American singer-songwriter
 Jose Vasquez Aguilar, first Filipino recipient of the Ramon Magsaysay Award